Titanyl sulfate is the inorganic compound with the formula TiOSO4.  It is a white solid that forms by treatment of titanium dioxide with fuming sulfuric acid.  It hydrolyzes to a gel of hydrated titanium dioxide.  The structure consists of dense polymeric network with tetrahedral sulfur and octahedral titanium centers.  The six ligands attached to titanium are derived from four different sulfate moieties and a bridging oxide.  A monohydrate is also known, being prepared similarly to the anhydrous material.  In the hydrate, one Ti–OS bond is replaced by Ti–OH2.

References

Titanium compounds
Sulfates